Bernard Greenhouse (January 3, 1916 – May 13, 2011) was an American cellist and one of the founding members of the Beaux Arts Trio.

Life and career
Greenhouse was born in Newark, New Jersey.  He started his professional studies with Felix Salmond at the Juilliard School when he was eighteen. After four years of study with Salmond, Greenhouse proceeded to move on to studies with Emanuel Feuermann, Diran Alexanian, and then became one of the very few long-term students of Pablo Casals, studying with him from 1946 to 1948.

After finishing studies with Casals, Greenhouse went on to pursue a solo career for twelve years. He struggled with this however, as the cello was not a very popular solo instrument at the time. During this period, he encountered violinist Daniel Guilet, who invited Greenhouse in 1954 to play some Mozart piano trios with pianist Menahem Pressler. In 1955 they met in New York City, the first meeting of what was to become the Beaux Arts Trio.

In 1958, Greenhouse acquired the Countess of Stanlein, also called the Paganini Strad, one of 63 Antonio Stradivari cellos, and  played it ever after. Following his death, it was to be sold by Boston violin dealer Christopher Reuning.

In 1987, he left the trio, and was replaced by cellist Peter Wiley. Greenhouse was known for his impeccable technique, but even more so for his inspiring passion and the depth and variety of his sound.

During his career, he taught at the Hartt College of Music, State University of New York at Stony Brook, Manhattan School of Music, New England Conservatory, Rutgers University and the Juilliard School. A series of videos of his master classes were produced in 1993 by Ethan Winer.

Though retired from institutional teaching, Greenhouse still gave master classes throughout the United States, Canada, China, Korea, Japan and Europe until his death in 2011.

Interviewed as the farewell concert of the Beaux Arts Trio on August 21, 2008 approached, he said he practiced every day and was considered "the old man of the cello", with other aging cellists being surprised that he still performed at the age of 95. Greenhouse also remained the oldest of those who have played in the trio, until at least 2015, Daniel Guilet (who was born about a week short of 17 years earlier) having died at the age of 91, and Isidore Cohen having died at 82.

Greenhouse's second passion was sailing on one of his several boats. He died on May 13, 2011 at his home overlooking the Wellfleet, Massachusetts harbor on Cape Cod. His daughter, Elena, with Aurora de la Luz Fernandez y Menendez, was married to author Nicholas Delbanco. His grandson-in-law is director Nicholas Stoller.

Students
Greenhouse's notable students include:
Timothy Eddy
Maxine Neuman
Paul Katz
Amit Peled
Damien Ventula
Stjepan Hauser
Uzi Wiesel
Astrid Schween
Kurt Baldwin
Sophia Bacelar

Partial discography
Appearances
With the Vellinger Quartet
Schubert: String Quintet in C (BBCMM75, 1998)

With the Henri René Orchestra
RCA Victor Presents Eartha Kitt (RCA, 1953)
That Bad Eartha (EP) (RCA, 1954)
Down To Eartha (RCA, 1955)
That Bad Eartha (LP) (RCA, 1956)
Thursday's Child (RCA, 1957)

References

Further reading
Bowed Arts--Gedanken von Bernard Greenhouse über sein Leben und die Musik.  Reflections of Bernard Greenhouse on His Life and Music, Laurinel Owen, Kronberg Academy Verlag, Kronberg im Taunus (2001).  The book is in German and in English (originally written in English and then translated into German and published in Germany).  .
The Beaux Arts Trio.  A Portrait, Nicholas Delbanco, William Morrow and Co., New York (1985).  .
The Countess of Stanlein Restored, Nicholas Delbanco, Verso, London & New York (2001).  A History of the Countess of Stanlein ex Paganini Stradivarius Cello of 1707.  .

External links
UNCG Special Collections and University Archives Cello Music Collection: Bernard Greenhouse
Bernard Greenhouse Personal Papers Collection, 1916-2011
UNCG Special Collections and University Archives past exhibits: Celebrating the Cello Music Collection: The Greenhouse Legacy
UNCG Digital Collections: Bernard Greenhouse Collection
Bach: Cantata No. 79 "Gott is unser Sonn' und Schild- performed by the  Bach Aria Group - Bernard Greenhouse, cello; Maureen Forrester, contralto; Robert Bloom, oboe; Paul Ulanowsky, piano (1966)  on archive.org

All articles with unsourced statements
American classical cellists
American music educators
Juilliard School alumni
Jewish American musicians
1916 births
2011 deaths
New England Conservatory faculty
Musicians from Newark, New Jersey
Classical musicians from New York (state)
Classical musicians from New Jersey
Beaux Arts Trio members
20th-century classical musicians
University of Hartford Hartt School faculty
Stony Brook University faculty
Manhattan School of Music faculty
Rutgers University faculty
Juilliard School faculty
20th-century cellists